Ștefan Tașnadi (21 March 1953 – 28 February 2018) was a Romanian heavyweight weightlifter who competed in the 1980 and 1984 Olympics winning a silver medal in 1984.  

Tașnadi took up lifting in 1970 at a sports school and from 1976 to 1984 was a member of the national team. He retired in 1984 to become a weightlifting coach at AS Clujana and CS Universitatea Cluj. He also served as an international weightlifting referee.

References

External links 

 
 
 

1953 births
2018 deaths
Olympic weightlifters of Romania
Weightlifters at the 1984 Summer Olympics
Weightlifters at the 1980 Summer Olympics
Olympic silver medalists for Romania
Olympic medalists in weightlifting
Medalists at the 1984 Summer Olympics
Romanian male weightlifters
Romanian people of Hungarian descent
Sportspeople from Cluj-Napoca

Romanian sportspeople of Hungarian descent